Hard Tack (March 25, 1926 – September 21, 1947) was an American  Thoroughbred  racehorse bred by James Cox Brady and sold after his death to the Wheatley Stable of Gladys Mills Phipps and her brother Ogden L. Mills. Sired by Man o' War, he showed considerable promise as a racer, but his temper prevented him from achieving success on the track. As an example, on one occasion when the starting gate opened and the horses rushed out,  Hard Tack stood perfectly still, refusing to budge.

Retired to stand at stud at Claiborne Farm near Paris, Kentucky, Hard Tack went on to sire the great racer Seabiscuit.

References

1926 racehorse births
1947 racehorse deaths
Racehorses bred in Kentucky
Racehorses trained in the United States
Thoroughbred family 9
Godolphin Arabian sire line